Bocock is a surname of English origin. At the time of the British Census of 1881, its frequency was highest in Lincolnshire (16.1 times the British average), followed by Cambridgeshire, Suffolk, Nottinghamshire, Northumberland, Yorkshire, Lancashire, Northamptonshire and Essex. In all other British counties its frequency was below national average. The name Bocock may refer to:

 Branch Bocock (20th century), head football coach for the University of Georgia
 Brian Bocock (born 1985), Major League Baseball shortstop
 Elizabeth Azcona Bocock (born 1969), Honduran politician
 Thomas S. Bocock (1815–1891), politician and lawyer
 Willis Henry Bocock (1865–1947), professor at the University of Georgia

See also

 Bocock Peak

References

Surnames